The discography of British trip hop group Portishead consists of three studio albums, one live album, one compilation, ten singles and one video album. The Bristol-based band consists of Geoff Barrow, Beth Gibbons and Adrian Utley.

Albums

Studio albums

Live albums

Singles

Compilations
1995 Glory Times (the "Glory Box" and "Sour Times" singles combined)
1995 The Rebirth of Cool Phive ("Revenge of the Number")

Video albums
1998 Roseland NYC Live (PAL video)
2002 Roseland NYC Live (DVD; also includes all single promos and short films shown in the videography section)

Collaborations and miscellaneous releases
1999: Portishead collaborated with Tom Jones on "Motherless Child" from his album of duets Reload. That album also has a cover of Portishead's "All Mine" sung as a duet with Neil Hannon from The Divine Comedy.
2003: Geoff Barrow along with Adrian Utley, Clive Deamer, Tim Saul and John Baggott assisted with the production of Stephanie McKay's McKay under the Go! Beat Records label.
2005: Geoff Barrow and Adrian Utley produced The Coral's The Invisible Invasion.
2006: Portishead recorded a cover of "Requiem for Anna" on the various artists compilation "Monsieur Gainsbourg revisited".
Portishead Interview and Mix CD (Geoff Barrow interviewed by Mark Findlay (INTER HEAD 1) and Mix by Geoff Barrow & Andy Smith with Cowboys (MIX HEAD 1))
 A track entitled "Acid Jazz & Trip Hop (Remix)" has been circulating the web and Portishead, Massive Attack, or Squarepusher are widely credited as the artist. However, the track is in fact a Portishead remix of an Unkle song that has been given different titles on a number of releases. On Unkle's earliest release, The Time Has Come EP, the track is entitled "If You Find Earth Boring (Portishead Plays U.N.K.L.E Mix)". However, on various compilations and "The Time Has Come" 2005 single by DJ Shadow, the track is entitled "Time Has Come (Portishead Plays Unkle Mix)".

Remixes
Depeche Mode – "In Your Room" (The Jeep Rock Mix) (1993)
Depeche Mode – "Walking in My Shoes" (Grungy Gonads Mix) (1993)
Gabrielle – "Going Nowhere" (Portishead Mix) (1993)
Whores of Babylon – "Fall of Agade" (Portishead Remix) (1993)
Paul Weller – "Wild Wood" (The Sheared Wood Remix) (1994)
Primal Scream – "Give Out but Don't Give Up" (Portishead Remix) (1994)
Ride – "Moonlight Medicine" (Portishead's Ride On The Wire Mix) (1994)
The Sabres of Paradise – "Planet D" (Portishead Remix) (1994)
Gravediggaz – "Nowhere to Run, Nowhere To Hide" (Portishead Remix) (1994)
The Federation – "Rusty James" (Portishead Remix) (1994)
UNKLE – "The Time Has Come" (Portishead Plays Unkle Mix) (1994)
Earthling – "1st Transmission" (Portishead's Earthead Mix) (1994)
Earthling – "Nefisa" (Portishead Mix) (1995)
Nine – "Whutcha Want?" (Portishead Mix) (1995)
Massive Attack – "Karmacoma" (Portishead Experience) (1995)
Junkwaffel – "Mudskipper" (Portishead So-So Mix) (1995)
My Dying Bride - "Grace Unhearing" (Portishell Mix) (1998)
Something for Kate – "Easy" (Mr Barrow and Mr Yates Surfin' For Kate Remix) (1999)
Machine Gun Fellatio – "Horny Blonde 40" (Portishead Remix) (2002)

Videography

Music videos
"Sour Times" (Hemming): made up of scenes from To Kill a Dead Man
"Numb" (dir. Alexander Hemming)
"Glory Box" (Hemming) homage to the Basil Dearden film Victim
"Wandering Star" (acoustic version)
"All Mine" (Dick Caruthers) based on a 1968 Italian talent show and The Outer Limits
"Over" (Chris Bran)
"Humming" (Ben Waters) A short film noir set to the song of the same name (2003)
"Only You" (Chris Cunningham)
"Machine Gun" (John Minton)
"Magic Doors" (John Minton)
"The Rip" (Nick Uff)
"We Carry On" (Nick Uff)
"SOS" (Unknown director)

Short films
To Kill a Dead Man (1994) (Alexander Hemming)

Other use in media

Advertisements
"Glory Box" appeared in a Levi's ad celebrating the watch pocket.
"Numb" was used in a commercial for the TV series Lost and featured in a commercial for the Nissan Primera.
"The Rip" was used in a TV commercial for the Gucci Bloom line of perfumes.
"Roads" was used in TV advertisements for One Campaign as well as for the Alfa Romeo 159.
"Machine Gun" was used in the Metro: Last Light teaser trailer.
"Chase the Tear" was used in the promotional teaser for the reality series Utopia.

Films
Nadja ("Strangers") ("Roads") (1994)
Assassins ("Sour Times") (1995)
Le Confessional ("Numb") (1995)
Go Now ("Mysterons") (1995)
Little Criminals ("Roads") (1995)
Tank Girl ("Roads") (1995)
The Craft ("Glory Box") (1996)
Mars Attacks! ("Humming") (1996)
Stealing Beauty ("Glory Box") (1996)
When the Cat's Away ("Glory Box") (1996)
Nowhere ("Mourning Air") (1997)
B Monkey ("Glory Box") (1998)
Cheaters ("Roads") (2000)
The Watcher ("Roads") (2000)
Sous le sable ("Undenied") (2000)
Lord of War ("Glory Box") (2005)
Sharkwater ("Roads") (2007)
Jake Blauvelt: Naturally ("Roads") (2013)
Wild ("Glory Box") (2014)
High-Rise ("SOS" [cover]) (2015)

Television
The Vice ("Sour Times") theme song
MTV Downtown ("Glory Box", "Sour Times") – "Insomnia", "Night Shift"
Crossing Jordan ("Strangers") – "Born to Run"
CSI: Crime Scene Investigation ("Glory Box") – "Chaos Theory", ("We Carry On") – "Leave Out All The Rest"
The L Word ("Roads") – "Limb from Limb"
Skins ("Undenied") "Maxxie and Anwar", ("Machine Gun") – "Effy"
Rescue Me ("Numb") – "Zombies", ("Glory Box" ") – "Thaw"
Warehouse 13 ("Only You") – "Elements", ("Sour Times") – "Time Will Tell"
Numb3rs ("Glory Box") – "And the Winner Is..."
Ringer ("Glory Box") – "If You Ever Want a French Lesson"
Defiance ("Roads") – "The Cord and the Ax"
Gotham ("Roads") – "Selina Kyle"
Person of Interest ("Roads") – "Nautilus"
The People v. O.J. Simpson: American Crime Story ("Sour Times") – "Marcia, Marcia, Marcia"
American Horror Story: Apocalypse ("Glory Box") – "Could It Be. . . Satan?"

Video games
 Grand Theft Auto V ("Numb"), track appears as PlayStation 4 and Xbox One exclusive track for fictional radio station WorldWide FM

Notes

References

Discographies of British artists
Electronic music discographies
Discography